Cameron ministry may refer to:

 First Cameron ministry, the British coalition government led by David Cameron from 2010 to 2015
 Second Cameron ministry, the British majority government led by David Cameron from 2015 to 2016

See also
 Shadow Cabinet of David Cameron
 Premiership of David Cameron